Desford railway station was a railway station in Leicestershire, England on the Leicester and Swannington Railway, which later became part of the Midland Railway's Leicester to Burton upon Trent Line.

History
The original station opened on 18 July 1832; originally named Desford Lane, it was renamed Desford by 26 April 1833. This station was closed on 27 March 1848, being replaced by a new station, also named Desford, sited  to the west of the original.

British Railways closed the station on 7 September 1964 but the line remains open for freight traffic.

References

Former Midland Railway stations
Disused railway stations in Leicestershire
Railway stations in Great Britain opened in 1832
Railway stations in Great Britain closed in 1848
Railway stations in Great Britain opened in 1848
Railway stations in Great Britain closed in 1964
Beeching closures in England